The men's 1500 metres race of the 2014–15 ISU Speed Skating World Cup 4, arranged in the Thialf arena in Heerenveen, Netherlands, was held on 14 December 2014.

Jan Szymański of Poland won, followed by Wouter olde Heuvel of the Netherlands in second place, and Shani Davis of the United States in third place. Joey Mantia of the United States won Division B.

Results
The race took place on Sunday, 14 December, with Division B scheduled in the morning session, at 10:03, and Division A scheduled in the afternoon session, at 14:54.

Division A

Division B

References

Men 1500
4